The following page lists most cave systems in Sri Lanka.

List of caves

See also 
 Geography of Sri Lanka

References 

 
Sri Lanka
caves